Manon is an opéra comique in five acts by Jules Massenet to a French libretto by Henri Meilhac and Philippe Gille, based on the 1731 novel L'histoire du chevalier des Grieux et de Manon Lescaut by the Abbé Prévost. It was first performed at the Opéra-Comique in Paris on 19 January 1884, with sets designed by Eugène Carpezat (act 1), Auguste Alfred Rubé and Philippe Chaperon (acts 2 and 3), and Jean-Baptiste Lavastre (act 4).

Prior to Massenet's work, Halévy (Manon Lescaut, ballet, 1830) and Auber (Manon Lescaut, opéra comique, 1856) had used the subject for musical stage works. Massenet also wrote a one-act sequel to Manon, Le portrait de Manon (1894), involving the Chevalier des Grieux as an older man.

The composer worked at the score of Manon at his country home outside Paris and also at a house at The Hague once occupied by Prévost himself.

Manon is Massenet's most popular and enduring opera and, having "quickly conquered the world's stages", it has maintained an important place in the repertory since its creation. It is the quintessential example of the charm and vitality of the music and culture of the Parisian Belle Époque. In 1893 an opera by Giacomo Puccini entitled Manon Lescaut, and based on the same novel was premiered and has also become popular.

Performance history

The opera was a mainstay of the Opéra-Comique in Paris, reaching its 1,000th performance there in 1919, its 1,500th in 1931 and 2,000th in 1952.

The first Manon was Marie Heilbron; other noted interpreters include Sibyl Sanderson (Massenet's personal favorite), Fanny Heldy, Lucrezia Bori, Amelita Galli-Curci, Bidu Sayão, Victoria de los Ángeles, Anna Moffo, Beverly Sills, Edita Gruberová, Renée Fleming, Anna Netrebko, and Natalie Dessay. Due to its heavy vocal demands, the role of Manon was described by Sills as "the French Isolde". As famous interpreters of Des Grieux, Kobbé lists Edmond Clément, Enrico Caruso, Beniamino Gigli, Tito Schipa and Ferruccio Tagliavini; Wolff also lists Gaston Micheletti, Adolphe Maréchal, Charles Fontaine and Libero de Luca.

Within a year of its Paris premiere, Manon was given its UK premiere in January 1885, in Liverpool; in the US, the Academy of Music in New York presented the opera later the same year, on 23 December. At the Royal Opera House in London it was first presented 19 May 1891. The Metropolitan Opera gave its first staging on 16 January 1895, and Manon has subsequently often been performed there. Anna Netrebko starred in a new production directed by Laurent Pelly, a co-production with the Royal Opera House, which was simulcast in HD on 7 April 2012. The San Francisco Opera gave the opera many stagings beginning on 29 September 1924.

In the 1980s a piano score was discovered where spoken dialogue was set as recitative by Massenet, possibly for the Italian premiere; this version was performed at the Opéra de Saint-Etienne as part of the 2009 Massenet Festival.

Today, Manon is frequently performed.

The ballet L'histoire de Manon by Kenneth MacMillan, although using music entirely written by Massenet, does not include any from Manon.

Roles

Synopsis
Place: France
Time: the reign of Louis XV

Act 1
The courtyard of an inn at Amiens

De Brétigny, a nobleman, has just arrived, in the company of Guillot, an aging rake who is the Minister of Finance, along with three flirtatious young actresses. While the innkeeper is serving dinner to the party, the townspeople collect to witness the arrival of the coach from Arras. Among them is Lescaut, a guardsman, who tells his comrades that he plans to meet a kinswoman. The coach appears, and among the crowd Lescaut quickly identifies his fragile young cousin, Manon, who appears to be somewhat confused ("Je suis encor tout étourdie") since this is her first journey, one which is taking her to the convent.

Manon is accosted by the opportunistic Guillot, who tells her that he has a carriage waiting, in which they can leave together. His heavy-handed seduction is undermined by the return of Lescaut, who then lectures the young woman ("Regardez-moi bien dans les yeux") on proper behavior. He leaves her unattended once more and she admires the three fashionably-dressed actresses, but reproaches herself ("Voyons, Manon"), unconvincingly vowing to rid herself of all worldly visions.

Des Grieux, traveling home to see his father, catches sight of Manon, and instantly falls in love. When he approaches, she is charmed by his chivalrous address ("Et je sais votre nom"), and their exchange rapidly becomes a mutual avowal of love. Both their planned journeys, hers to the convent and des Grieux's to his home, are swiftly abandoned, as they decide to flee together ("Nous vivrons à Paris"). But there are hints of incompatible aspirations: while he returns, over and again, to "tous les deux" (together), the phrase she fondly repeats is, "à Paris". Making good use of the carriage provided by the disappointed Guillot, the lovers escape.

Act 2
Manon and des Grieux's apartment in Paris

With little hope, des Grieux writes to his father, imploring permission to marry Manon. Lescaut enters intent on creating a scene and accompanied by de Brétigny, who is masquerading as a fellow-guardsman. But his concern for offended family honor is only camouflage for his alliance with his friend. Trying to prove his honorable intentions, des Grieux shows Lescaut the letter to his father. Meanwhile, de Brétigny warns Manon that des Grieux is going to be abducted that evening, on the orders of his father, and offers her his protection and wealth, trying to persuade her to move on to a better future.

After the two visitors depart, Manon appears to vacillate between accepting de Brétigny's offer and warning des Grieux. When her lover goes out to post his letter, her farewell to the humble domesticity she has shared ("Adieu, notre petite table") makes clear she has decided to go with de Brétigny. Unaware of her change of heart, des Grieux returns and conveys his more modest vision of their future happiness ("En fermant les yeux", the "Dream Song"). Going outside to investigate an apparent disturbance, he is seized and hustled away, leaving Manon to voice her regrets.

Act 3
Scene 1: Paris, the promenade of the Cours-la-Reine on a feast-day

Among the throng of holiday-makers and vendors of all kinds are Lescaut and Guillot, the latter still flirting with the young actresses, while Lescaut expresses the joys of gambling ("À quoi bon l'économie?"). De Brétigny arrives, soon joined by Manon, now sumptuously dressed and with a retinue of admirers. She sings about her new situation ("Je marche sur tous les chemins"), following it with a gavotte ("Obéissons quand leur voix appelle") on the joys of love and youth.

Des Grieux's father, the Comte, greets de Brétigny and Manon overhears that her former lover is Chevalier no longer, but Abbé, having entered the seminary of Saint-Sulpice. Approaching the Comte, Manon tries to discover whether his son still loves her. Guillot then attempts to win Manon over by bringing the ballet dancers of the Académie Royale de Musique, which she had expressed a desire to see. However Manon is seized by the desire to see des Grieux once more, and admits, to Guillot's annoyance when asked, that she paid no attention to the dancers. She hurries off to Saint-Sulpice.

Scene 2: Saint-Sulpice

From the chapel, the congregation is leaving, enthusiastic over the sermon of the new abbé ("Quelle éloquence!"). Des Grieux enters, in clerical garb, and his father adds his voice to the chorus of praise, but tries to dissuade his son from this new life, so that he can perpetuate the family name ("Epouse quelque brave fille").

He leaves, having failed to shake his son's resolve and, alone, des Grieux relives memories of Manon ("Ah! Fuyez, douce image"). As he prays, Manon herself appears, to implore his forgiveness for her faithlessness. Furiously, he attempts to reject her, but when (in "N'est-ce plus ma main?") she recalls their past intimacies, his resistance is overcome, and their voices join in an impassioned avowal of love.

Act 4
A gaming salon at the Hôtel de Transylvanie

Lescaut and Guillot are among the gamblers, and the three young actresses are prepared to attach themselves to any winner. Manon arrives with des Grieux who declares his total love: ("Manon! Manon! Sphinx étonnant"). He is persuaded to gamble, in hopes of gaining the wealth she craves. He plays at cards with Guillot and continually wins, as Guillot doubles and redoubles the wager. As Manon exults, Guillot accuses des Grieux of cheating. Des Grieux denies the charge and Guillot leaves, returning shortly with the police, to whom he denounces des Grieux as a cheat and Manon as dissolute.

The elder des Grieux enters, and tells his son that, while he will intercede on his behalf, he will do nothing to save Manon. In a big ensemble, with Guillot exulting over his revenge, Manon lamenting the end of all joy, des Grieux swearing to defend her, and the rest expressing consternation and horror, the arrested pair are led away.

Act 5
[Act 4, Scene 2 in the original version]

A desolate spot near the road to Le Havre

Convicted as a woman of ill-fame, Manon has been condemned to be deported. Des Grieux, freed by his father's intervention, and a penitent Lescaut, now his ally, wait to waylay the convoy in which Manon is being marched to the port. A detachment of soldiers arrives with their prisoners. The would-be rescuers recognize the hopelessness of attacking so strong an escort, but Lescaut succeeds in bribing their sergeant to allow Manon to stay behind till evening. The convoy moves on, and a sick and exhausted Manon falls to the ground at des Grieux's feet.

In his arms, near delirium, she relives their former happiness. Des Grieux tells her the past can exist again but Manon, now calm, knows that it is too late. With the words "Et c'est là l'histoire de Manon Lescaut", she dies.

Noted arias
Act 1 – Manon: "Je suis encore tout étourdie" ("I am still completely dazed")
Act 2 – des Grieux: "En fermant les yeux" ("Closing my eyes")
Act 2 – Manon: "Adieu, notre petite table" ("Goodbye, our little table")
Act 3 – Manon: "Obéissons quand leur voix appelle" ("Let us obey when their voice calls us")
Act 3 – des Grieux: "Ah, fuyez douce image" ("Ah, flee, sweet image")

Recordings

References
Notes

Sources
 Bland, Alexander (1981). The Royal Ballet: The First 50 Years. London: Threshold Books. .
 Harding, James (1970). Massenet. London: Dent. .
 Holden, Amanda, editor (2001). The New Penguin Opera Guide, New York: Penguin Putnam. .
 Kobbé, Gustav (1976). The Complete Opera Book. New York: G. P. Putnam's Sons, pp. 858–864. .
 Macdonald, Hugh (2001). "Jules Massenet" in Holden 2001, pp. 542-554.
 Wolff, Stéphane (1953). Un demi-siècle d'Opéra-Comique (1900–1950). Paris: André Bonne. Listings at WorldCat.

Further reading
 Cross, Milton (1955). The New Milton Cross' Complete Stories of the Great Operas. Garden City, NY: Doubleday, pp. 353–361. Listings at WorldCat.
 Huebner, Steven (2006). French Opera at the Fin de Siècle. New York: Oxford University Press, pp. 45–72. .
 Upton, George P.; Borowski, Felix (1928). The Standard Opera Guide. New York: Blue Ribbon Books, pp. 179–181. .
 Warrack, John; West, Ewan (1992). The Oxford Dictionary of Opera. Oxford: Oxford University Press, p. 438. .

External links
 
Full orchestral score at indiana.edu
Visual documentation of the premiere on Gallica
 Free Online opera guide on Massenet’s MANON, An opera portrait with synopsis, commentary, music analysis, anecdotes
 Manon, opéra comique, 5 acts, 1895 publication, digitized by BYU on archive.org

Adaptations of works by Antoine François Prévost
Operas by Jules Massenet
French-language operas
Operas set in France
Opéras comiques
1884 operas
Operas based on novels
Opera world premieres at the Opéra-Comique
Operas
Belle Époque
Operas set in Paris